Le Breuil may refer to the following communes in France:

Le Breuil, Allier, in the Allier département 
Le Breuil, Marne, in the Marne département 
Le Breuil, Rhône, in the Rhône département 
Le Breuil, Saône-et-Loire, in the Saône-et-Loire département 
Le Breuil-Bernard, in the Deux-Sèvres département 
Le Breuil-en-Auge, in the Calvados département 
Le Breuil-en-Bessin, in the Calvados département 
Le Breuil-sous-Argenton, in the Deux-Sèvres département 
Le Breuil-sur-Couze, in the Puy-de-Dôme département

See also
 Breuil (disambiguation)